The Twenty-Four Histories, also known as the Orthodox Histories, are the Chinese official dynastic histories covering from the earliest dynasty in 3000 BC to the Ming dynasty in the 17th century.

The Han dynasty official Sima Qian established many of the conventions of the genre, but the form was not fixed until much later. Starting with the Tang dynasty, each dynasty established an official office to write the history of its predecessor using official court records, partly in order to establish its own link to the earliest times. As fixed and edited in the Qing dynasty, the whole set contains 3,213 volumes and about 40 million words. It is considered one of the most important sources on Chinese history and culture.

The title "Twenty-Four Histories" dates from 1775, which was the 40th year in the reign of the Qianlong Emperor. This was when the last volume, the History of Ming, was reworked and a complete set of the histories was produced.

Collection

Inheritance works
These works were begun by one historian and completed by an heir, usually of the next generation.
Records of the Grand Historian, inherited from Sima Tan 司馬談 (father) by Sima Qian 司馬遷 (son)
Book of Han, inherited from Ban Biao 班彪 (father), Ban Gu (son) by Ban Zhao 班昭 (daughter/sister)
Book of Liang and Book of Chen, inherited from Yao Cha 姚察 (father) by Yao Silian 姚思廉 (son)
Book of Northern Qi, inherited from Li Delin 李德林 (father) by Li Baiyao 李百藥 (son)
History of the Southern Dynasties and History of the Northern Dynasties, inherited from Li Dashi 李大師 (father) by Li Yanshou 李延壽 (son)

Related works
There were attempts at producing new historiographies after the Qing dynasty, but they either never gained widespread acceptance as part of the official historical canon or they remain unfinished.

Modern attempts at creating the official Qing history
In 1961, to commemorate the 50th anniversary of the declaration of the Republic of China (ROC), the ROC government in Taiwan published the History of Qing, adding 21 supplementary chapters to the Draft History of Qing and revising many existing chapters to denounce the People's Republic of China (PRC) as an illegitimate, impostor regime. It also removed passages that were derogatory towards the Xinhai Revolution. This edition has not been widely accepted as the official Qing history because it is recognized that it was a rushed job motivated by political objectives. It does not correct most of the errors known to exist in the Draft History of Qing.

An additional project, attempting to write a New History of Qing incorporating new materials and improvements in historiography, lasted from 1988 to 2000. Only 33 chapters out of the projected 500 were published. This project was later abandoned following the rise of the Pan-Green Coalition, which sees Taiwan as a distinct entity from Mainland China, both culturally and politically. As such, it is argued that it is not the duty of the Taiwanese regime to compile the Qing history.

In 1961, the PRC also attempted to complete the Qing history, but historians were prevented from doing so against the backdrop of the Cultural Revolution.

In 2002, the PRC once again announced that it would complete the History of Qing. The project was approved in 2003, and put under the leadership of historian Dai Yi. Initially planned to be completed in 10 years, the project suffered multiple delays, pushing completion of the first draft to 2016. Chinese Social Sciences Today reported in April 2020 that the project's results were being reviewed.

Modern editions
In China, the Zhonghua Book Company (Zhonghua Shuju) have edited a number of these histories. They have been collated, edited, and punctuated by Chinese specialists.

From 1991 to 2003, it was translated from Classical Chinese into modern written vernacular Chinese, by Xu Jialu and other scholars.

Translations
One of the Twenty-Four Histories is in the process of being fully translated into English: Records of the Grand Historian by William Nienhauser, in nine volumes.

In Korean and Vietnamese, only the Records has been translated. Most of the histories have been translated into Japanese.

See also

Chinese classic texts
Draft History of Qing, a continuation of the histories through 1911
History of China
Official communications of the Chinese Empire
Zizhi Tongjian

References

Citations

Sources

External links

Chinese Literature The Ershiwushi 二十五史 "The Twenty-five Official Dynastic Histories" (zhengshi 正史) Ulrich Theobold, China Knowledge

 
 
Series of history books